James Kavanagh may refer to:

 James B. Kavanagh (1800–1886), Irish priest, teacher and president of St. Patrick's College, Carlow
 James Kavanagh (bishop) (1914–2002), Irish priest and professor
 James Kavanagh (public figure) (born 1989), Irish social media personality and television presenter

See also
 James Cavanagh (disambiguation)
 James Kavanaugh (died 2009), author of A Modern Priest Looks at His Outdated Church